Nathalys Ceballos (born March 10, 1990) is a Puerto Rican handball player who plays for the club Rio Grande Handball. She is a member of the Puerto Rican national team. Ceballos competed at the 2015 World Women's Handball Championship in Denmark.

Individual awards and recognitions
2015 Pan American Women's Handball Championship: All Star Team Right Back
2015 Pan American Games: 3rd top scorer with 34 goals
2017 Nor.Ca. Women's Handball Championship: All Star Team Center Back

References

1990 births
Living people
Puerto Rican female handball players
Handball players at the 2007 Pan American Games
Handball players at the 2011 Pan American Games
Handball players at the 2015 Pan American Games
Handball players at the 2019 Pan American Games
Pan American Games competitors for Puerto Rico
Central American and Caribbean Games silver medalists for Puerto Rico
Competitors at the 2018 Central American and Caribbean Games
Central American and Caribbean Games medalists in handball
21st-century Puerto Rican women